Giovanni De Gennaro may refer to:
 Giovanni de Gennaro (bishop) (died 1556), Roman Catholic prelate
 Giovanni De Gennaro (police officer) (born 1948), chairman of the first Italian Defense Group Leonardo (formerly Finmeccanica)
 Giovanni De Gennaro (canoeist) (born 1992), Italian slalom canoeist